Kichinjio is a part of Kibera slum in Nairobi. Kichinjio has a New Adventure Secondary School and a Kicoshep Primary School. Furthermore, Kichinjio has a mosque. Other parts of Kibera include Laini Saba, Lindi, Makina, Kianda, Gatwekera, Soweto East, Kisumu Ndogo, Makongeni and Mashimoni.

See also 
Kambi Muru
Raila
Sarang'ombe
Shilanga
Siranga

References 

Suburbs of Nairobi
Slums in Kenya
Squatting in Kenya